Rim Un-sim (born 5 July 1996) is a North Korean weightlifter.

She participated at the 2018 World Weightlifting Championships, winning a medal.

Personal life 
Has an older sister Rim Jong-sim who is a weightlifter in 76 kg division.

References

External links

1996 births
Living people
North Korean female weightlifters
World Weightlifting Championships medalists
Asian Games medalists in weightlifting
Weightlifters at the 2018 Asian Games
Medalists at the 2018 Asian Games
Asian Games gold medalists for North Korea
Universiade gold medalists for North Korea
Universiade medalists in weightlifting
21st-century North Korean women